Williston Highlands is a census-designated place (CDP) in Levy County, Florida, United States. The population was 2,275 at the 2010 census.

Geography
Williston Highlands is located at  (29.330407, -82.533343).

Demographics

As of the census of 2000, there were 1,386 people, 600 households, and 414 families residing in the CDP. The racial makeup of the CDP was 94.16% White, 3.68% African American, 0.58% Native American, 0.14% Asian, 0.22% Pacific Islander, 0.29% from other races, and 0.94% from two or more races. Hispanic or Latino of any race were 3.90% of the population.

There were 600 households, out of which 20.3% had children under the age of 18 living with them, 57.2% were married couples living together, 7.8% had a female householder with no husband present, and 31.0% were non-families. 25.7% of all households were made up of individuals, and 13.7% had someone living alone who was 65 years of age or older. The average household size was 2.31 and the average family size was 2.71.

In the CDP, the population was spread out, with 20.0% under the age of 18, 5.3% from 18 to 24, 22.7% from 25 to 44, 26.7% from 45 to 64, and 25.3% who were 65 years of age or older. The median age was 46 years. For every 100 females, there were 97.4 males. For every 100 females age 18 and over, there were 95.6 males.

The median income for a household in the CDP was $23,607, and the median income for a family was $26,941. Males had a median income of $29,648 versus $22,000 for females. The per capita income for the CDP was $14,365. About 19.9% of families and 21.1% of the population were below the poverty line, including 31.1% of those under age 18 and 14.1% of those age over 64.

References

Census-designated places in Levy County, Florida
Census-designated places in Florida
Williston, Florida